The following is a partial list of the "D" codes for Medical Subject Headings (MeSH), as defined by the United States National Library of Medicine (NLM).

This list continues the information at List of MeSH codes (D08). Codes following these are found at List of MeSH codes (D10). For other MeSH codes, see List of MeSH codes.

The source for this content is the set of 2006 MeSH Trees from the NLM.

– carbohydrates

– amino sugars

– hexosamines
  – fructosamine
  – galactosamine
  – acetylgalactosamine
  – glucosamine
  – acetylglucosamine
  – meglumine
  – diatrizoate meglumine
  – iothalamate meglumine

– muramic acids
  – acetylmuramyl-alanyl-isoglutamine

– neuraminic acids
  – sialic acids
  – cytidine monophosphate n-acetylneuraminic acid
  – n-acetylneuraminic acid

– deoxy sugars

– deoxyglucose
  – fluorodeoxyglucose f18

– deoxyribose

– fucose

– rhamnose

– dietary carbohydrates

– dietary sucrose

– glycoconjugates

– glycolipids
  – galactolipids
  – glycosphingolipids
  – acidic glycosphingolipids
  – antigens, cd15
  – gangliosides
  – g(m1) ganglioside
  – g(m2) ganglioside
  – g(m3) ganglioside
  – sulfoglycosphingolipids
  – neutral glycosphingolipids
  – ceramides
  – cerebrosides
  – galactosylceramides
  – glucosylceramides
  – globosides
  – lactosylceramides
  – trihexosylceramides
  – sphingomyelins
  – psychosine
  – glycosylphosphatidylinositols

– glycopeptides
  – bleomycin
  – peplomycin
  – phleomycins
  – peptidoglycan
  – ristocetin
  – teicoplanin
  – vancomycin

– glycoproteins
  – adam proteins

– lipopolysaccharides

– glycosides

– aminoglycosides
  – anthracyclines
  – aclarubicin
  – daunorubicin
  – carubicin
  – doxorubicin
  – epirubicin
  – idarubicin
  – nogalamycin
  – menogaril
  – plicamycin
  – butirosin sulfate
  – gentamicins
  – sisomicin
  – netilmicin
  – hygromycin b
  – kanamycin
  – amikacin
  – dibekacin
  – nebramycin
  – tobramycin
  – metrizamide
  – neomycin
  – framycetin
  – paromomycin
  – ribostamycin
  – puromycin
  – puromycin aminonucleoside
  – streptomycin
  – dihydrostreptomycin sulfate
  – streptothricins
  – streptozocin

– anthocyanins

– atractyloside

– cardiac glycosides
  – digitalis glycosides
  – digitonin
  – digitoxin
  – acetyldigitoxins
  – digoxin
  – acetyldigoxins
  – medigoxin
  – lanatosides
  – deslanoside
  – proscillaridin
  – strophanthins
  – cymarine
  – ouabain

– chromomycins
  – chromomycin a3

– galactosides
  – methylgalactosides
  – nitrophenylgalactosides
  – thiogalactosides
  – isopropyl thiogalactoside

– glucosides
  – amygdalin
  – arbutin
  – chloralose
  – esculin
  – etoposide
  – methylglucosides
  – 3-o-methylglucose
  – picrotoxin
  – teniposide
  – thioglucosides
  – glucosinolates

– hemoglobin a, glycosylated

– lincomycin
  – clindamycin

– macrolides
  – amphotericin b
  – candicidin
  – erythromycin
  – azithromycin
  – clarithromycin
  – erythromycin estolate
  – erythromycin ethylsuccinate
  – ketolides
  – roxithromycin
  – ivermectin
  – josamycin
  – leucomycins
  – kitasamycin
  – spiramycin
  – lucensomycin
  – maytansine
  – mepartricin
  – miocamycin
  – natamycin
  – nystatin
  – oleandomycin
  – troleandomycin
  – oligomycins
  – rutamycin
  – tylosin

– mannosides
  – methylmannosides

– methylglycosides
  – methylgalactosides
  – methylglucosides
  – 3-o-methylglucose
  – methylmannosides

– novobiocin

– nucleosides

– nucleotides
  – nucleoside diphosphate sugars
  – adenosine diphosphate sugars
  – adenosine diphosphate glucose
  – adenosine diphosphate ribose
  – o-acetyl-adp-ribose
  – cyclic adp-ribose
  – poly adenosine diphosphate ribose
  – cytidine diphosphate diglycerides
  – guanosine diphosphate sugars
  – guanosine diphosphate fucose
  – guanosine diphosphate mannose
  – uridine diphosphate sugars
  – uridine diphosphate n-acetylgalactosamine
  – uridine diphosphate n-acetylglucosamine
  – uridine diphosphate n-acetylmuramic acid
  – uridine diphosphate galactose
  – uridine diphosphate glucose
  – uridine diphosphate glucuronic acid
  – uridine diphosphate xylose

– olivomycins

– phlorhizin

– saponins
  – escin
  – ginsenosides
  – holothurin
  – solanine

– teichoic acids

– thioglycosides
  – thiogalactosides
  – isopropyl thiogalactoside
  – thioglucosides
  – glucosinolates

– tomatine

– imino sugars

– imino furanoses

– imino pyranoses

– monosaccharides

– heptoses
  – mannoheptulose

– hexoses
  – fructose
  – fucose
  – galactose
  – glucose
  – blood glucose
  – mannose
  – rhamnose
  – sorbose

– ketoses
  – dihydroxyacetone
  – fructose
  – mannoheptulose
  – sorbose
  – xylulose

– pentoses
  – arabinose
  – ribose
  – xylose
  – xylulose

– tetroses

– trioses
  – dihydroxyacetone
  – glyceraldehyde
  – glyceraldehyde 3-phosphate

– polysaccharides

– alginates

– carrageenan

– chitin
  – chitosan

– ficoll

– fructans
  – inulin

– galactans
  – agar

– glucans
  – beta-glucans
  – lentinan
  – sizofiran
  – zymosan
  – cellulose
  – cellobiose
  – cellulose, oxidized
  – deae-cellulose
  – lignin
  – methylcellulose
  – carboxymethylcellulose
  – dextrans
  – deae-dextran
  – dextran sulfate
  – iron-dextran complex
  – glycogen
  – liver glycogen
  – isomaltose
  – maltose
  – starch
  – amylopectin
  – amylose
  – dextrins
  – cyclodextrins
  – alpha-cyclodextrins
  – beta-cyclodextrins
  – gamma-cyclodextrins
  – hetastarch
  – inulin
  – trehalose

– glycosaminoglycans
  – chondroitin
  – chondroitin sulfates
  – dermatan sulfate
  – heparin
  – heparin, low-molecular-weight
  – dalteparin
  – enoxaparin
  – nadroparin
  – heparinoids
  – heparitin sulfate
  – heparan sulfate proteoglycan
  – hyaluronic acid
  – keratan sulfate

– gum arabic

– karaya gum

– mannans

– oligosaccharides
  – disaccharides
  – cellobiose
  – isomaltose
  – lactose
  – lactulose
  – maltose
  – melibiose
  – sucrose
  – dietary sucrose
  – sucralfate
  – trehalose
  – oligosaccharides, branched-chain
  – trisaccharides
  – acarbose
  – raffinose

– pectins

– pentosan sulfuric polyester

– polysaccharides, bacterial
  – bacterial capsules
  – bambermycins
  – lipopolysaccharides
  – lipid a
  – o antigens
  – peptidoglycan
  – prodigiozan
  – teichoic acids

– proteoglycans
  – heparan sulfate proteoglycan
  – platelet factor 4
  – proteochondroitin sulfates

– sepharose

– tragacanth

– xylans

– sugar acids

– ascorbic acid
  – dehydroascorbic acid

– 2,3-diketogulonic acid

– glucaric acid

– gluconates
  – antimony sodium gluconate
  – calcium gluconate

– glyceric acids
  – diphosphoglyceric acids
  – 2,3-diphosphoglycerate

– muramic acids
  – acetylmuramyl-alanyl-isoglutamine

– neuraminic acids
  – sialic acids
  – cytidine monophosphate n-acetylneuraminic acid
  – n-acetylneuraminic acid

– tartrates

– tartronates

– uronic acids
  – glucuronic acids
  – glucuronic acid
  – glucuronates
  – glucuronides
  – hexuronic acids
  – iduronic acid

– sugar alcohols

– dithioerythritol

– dithiothreitol

– erythritol
  – erythrityl tetranitrate

– galactitol
  – dianhydrogalactitol
  – mitolactol

– glycerol

– inositol
  – inositol phosphates
  – inositol 1,4,5-trisphosphate
  – phytic acid

– mannitol
  – mannitol phosphates
  – mitobronitol

– ribitol

– sorbitol
  – isosorbide
  – isosorbide dinitrate
  – meglumine
  – diatrizoate meglumine
  – iothalamate meglumine

– xylitol

– sugar phosphates

– dihydroxyacetone phosphate

– glycerophosphates
  – glycerylphosphorylcholine

– hexosephosphates
  – fructosephosphates
  – fructosediphosphates
  – galactosephosphates
  – glucosephosphates
  – glucose-6-phosphate
  – hexosediphosphates
  – fructosediphosphates
  – mannosephosphates

– inositol phosphates
  – inositol 1,4,5-trisphosphate
  – phytic acid

– mannitol phosphates

– pentosephosphates
  – phosphoribosyl pyrophosphate
  – ribosemonophosphates
  – ribulosephosphates

– polyisoprenyl phosphate sugars
  – polyisoprenyl phosphate monosaccharides
  – dolichol monophosphate mannose
  – polyisoprenyl phosphate oligosaccharides

– teichoic acids

The list continues at List of MeSH codes (D10).

D09